Lloyd Borgers (born 24 February 1993) is a Dutch footballer who plays as a striker for amateur side SV Meerssen.

Borgers played professional football for MVV Maastricht. He was released by MVV in 2013 and joined Hoofdklasse side EHC. He later played for Belgian Vierde Klasse side VV Neerpelt and moved to SV Meerssen in 2015.

Besides playing football on amateur level since 2013, Borgers has worked for industrial engineering company Flexprof in Maastricht together with fellow former MVV player Lance Voorjans.

References

External links
 Voetbal International

1993 births
Living people
Association football forwards
Dutch footballers
MVV Maastricht players
Eerste Divisie players
SV Meerssen players
EHC Hoensbroek players
Footballers from Maastricht